Abdelfattah El Khattari (born 3 March 1977) is a Moroccan former footballer. He competed in the men's tournament at the 2000 Summer Olympics.

References

External links
 
 

1977 births
Living people
Moroccan footballers
Morocco international footballers
Olympic footballers of Morocco
Footballers at the 2000 Summer Olympics
Place of birth missing (living people)
Association football forwards
Maghreb de Fès players
Wydad AC players
SCC Mohammédia players
Bahrain SC players
Moroccan expatriate footballers
Expatriate footballers in Bahrain